Carlos Henrique is a Portuguese masculine blended given name from the German root names Karl and Haimirich.  Notable people referred to by this name include the following:

Carlos Henrique Alves Pereira, known as Carlos Henrique (footballer) or simply Carlos, (born 1995), Brazilian football player
Carlos Henrique Barbosa Augusto, known as Henrique (footballer, born 1989), Brazilian football player
Carlos Henrique Elias, known as Carlos "Caique" Elias (born 1957), Brazilian Jiu-Jitsu master
Carlos Henrique Carneiro Marinho, known as Carlinhos (footballer, born 1983), Brazilian football player
Carlos Henrique Casimiro, known as Casemiro, (born 1992), Brazilian football player
Carlos Henrique de Brito Cruz (born 1956) Brazilian physicist
Carlos Henrique de Oliveira, known as Carlinhos (footballer, born January 1986), Brazilian footballer
Carlos Henrique de Senna Fernandes Basto, known as Carlos Henrique Basto or Charles Henrique de Basto, (1890 – 1944), Portuguese businessman
Carlos Henrique Dias, known as Kim (footballer), Brazilian football player
Carlos Henrique dos Santos Costa, known as Lula (footballer, born 1992), Brazilian football player
Carlos Henrique dos Santos Souza, known as Henrique (footballer, born 1983), Brazilian football player
Carlos Henrique França Freires, known as França (footballer, born 1995), Brazilian football player
Carlos Henrique Hernández, known as Carlos Hernández (pitcher, born 1980) (born 1980), Venezuelan baseball player
Carlos Henrique Kroeber, known as Carlos Kroeber (1934–1999), Brazilian actor
Carlos Henrique Manzato dos Santos, known as Cahê, (born 1982), Brazilian football player
Carlos Henrique Raimundo Rodrigues, known as Henrique (footballer, born 1976) (born 1976), Brazilian football player
Carlos Henrique Raposo, known as Carlos Kaiser (footballer), (born 1963), Brazilian football player
Carlos Henrique Rodrigues do Nascimento, known as Olívia (basketball), (born 1974), Brazilian basketball player
Carlos Henrique Schroder (born 1959), Brazilian journalist and executive

See also

Notes

Portuguese masculine given names